The Open de Guadeloupe (formerly known as Orange Open Guadeloupe) is a tennis tournament held in Le Gosier, Guadeloupe since 2011. The event is part of the ATP Challenger Tour and is played on hard courts.

Past finals

Singles

Doubles

References

External links

 
ATP Challenger Tour
Tennis tournaments in France
Hard court tennis tournaments